The 2022 Perlis state election, formally the 15th Perlis state election, took place on 19 November 2022. This election was to elect 15 members of the 15th Perlis State Legislative Assembly. The previous assembly was dissolved on 14 October 2022.

The incumbent Barisan Nasional (BN) coalition faced a historic wipeout (first time in Perlis and second time in national level), winning no seats. The Perikatan Nasional (PN) coalition won 14 of 15 seats (achieving supermajority) and formed the first ever non-UMNO/BN government in the state's history. Pakatan Harapan (PH) meanwhile won only one seat, becoming the sole opposition in the state assembly.

Constituencies

Composition before dissolution

Electoral candidates 
The official list of candidates will be publish on 5 November 2022 by Election Commission (SPR).

Results

By parliamentary constituency
Perikatan Nasional won all of 3 parliamentary constituency.

Seats that changed allegiance

Aftermath

Mohd Shukri Ramli from PAS was sworn in as the new Menteri Besar on 22 November 2022, while the 6 state EXCO members were sworn in on 25 November 2022. Gan Ay Ling, the sole opposition member of the Assembly, was made the Opposition Leader.

See also 
 2022 Malaysian general election
 Politics of Malaysia
 List of political parties in Malaysia

References 

2022 elections in Malaysia
2022
2022 in Malaysia
2022 in Malaysian politics
November 2022 events in Malaysia